William Barclay (1873 or 1874–1945) was a unionist politician in Northern Ireland.

Barclay worked as a shipyard joiner and was elected to the Senate of Northern Ireland as an Ulster Unionist Party member in 1925, despite having no political experience.  He served until his death in 1945.

References

1870s births
1945 deaths
Members of the Senate of Northern Ireland 1925–1929
Members of the Senate of Northern Ireland 1929–1933
Members of the Senate of Northern Ireland 1933–1937
Members of the Senate of Northern Ireland 1937–1941
Members of the Senate of Northern Ireland 1941–1945
Ulster Unionist Party members of the Senate of Northern Ireland